Oksana Omelianchik (alternative transliterations: Oksana Omel'yantchik, Oksana Omeliantchik; born 2 January 1970) is a retired Soviet gymnast and the all-around gold medalist of the 1985 World Championships. Omelianchik was most known for her enthusiastic showmanship, difficulty and originality, including pioneering back-to-back tumbling.

Early life and career
Omelianchik was born on 2 January 1970 in Ulan-Ude, Russian SFSR, Soviet Union. She was originally a figure skater, and participated in her first skating meet at the age of 6. She began gymnastics on the recommendation of her skating choreographer, who believed she had potential in the sport. She trained at the Spartak club in Kiev, where her coaches included Valentina Panchenko, Valery Tupitsy and Galina Perskaya.

By 1983, Omelianchik was competing internationally for the USSR. At that year's Junior Friendship Tournament (Druzhba), an important meet for junior gymnasts, she earned gold medals on the floor exercise and uneven bars and placed fourth in the all-around competition. At her first USSR Championships in 1983, she placed fifth in the all-around. The next year, she competed in both the junior and senior USSR Championships, winning the all-around silver medal at the former and finishing fourth at the latter, and was selected as the alternate for the Soviet team at the 1984 Friendship Games (also known as 'Olomouc', after the city in which the competition was held).

Senior career
In 1985, Omelianchik won the Soviet National Championships, beating the future Olympic champion Elena Shushunova. She also competed at the European Championships for the first time, winning the balance beam title showing a triple twist dismount. She also won a bronze medal in the all-around behind Shushunova and East German Maxi Gnauck, silver on the floor exercise and bronze on the uneven bars.

Omelianchik was a member of the first place Soviet team at the 1985 World Gymnastics Championships in Montreal, but struggled in the team competition and did not qualify for the all-around final. However, Soviet team officials decided to pull Olga Mostepanova and Irina Baraksanova, who had both qualified for the finals, and substitute Omelianchik and her teammate Shushunova. The decision proved to be sound; the two Soviet gymnasts tied for the all-around gold and became Worlds co-champions. In the event finals, Omelianchik won the floor gold medal with her "Birdie" exercise, which would become her most well-known routine.

Omelianchik continued to compete for the Soviet team after the World Championships, placing third in the all-around at the 1986 Goodwill Games and third all around at the World Cup in Beijing. She also won the balance beam title and placed second on uneven bars and vault and third on floor exercise. The following year at the World Championships the Soviet team lost the title to a dominant team from Romania. Omelianchik debuted her new vault which introduced the half on technique in the roundoff family of vaults. She also showcased a new floor routine to Ballet Russe and a new triple full to a tuck front rebound, but suffered an uncharacteristic fall in the team competition. She placed fifth all around and failed to compete in any event finals.  She qualified for the vault final but was withdrawn and Svetlana Baitova competed in her place.

Despite maintaining consistent results within the top the 7 in the USSR Cup and USSR Championships for years, she was not selected for the 1988 Olympics. She was named as an alternate to the team and traveled with them to Seoul, but was not called upon to compete. Her final competition was the 1989 USSR Cup, where she placed 2nd in the all-around.

Post-retirement
Omelianchik remains heavily involved in gymnastics as a choreographer, coach and judge. She heads the women's technical committee for the Ukrainian Gymnastics Federation and choreographs routines for many of Ukraine's top gymnastics, including Alina Kozich and Olha Rozshchupkina.

In a poll in Inside Gymnastics magazine, she was chosen as one of the "Top Ten All-Around Gymnasts of All Time."

Skills
Omelianchik was noted for her innovative skills, clean execution and energetic, inspired presentation. Omelianchik was one of the pioneers of back-to-back tumbling on floor exercise, a series of skills in which a gymnast completes one full tumbling run from one end of the mat to the other, rebounds, and performs another complete tumbling run in the opposite direction without stopping.

Eponymous skills
Omelianchik has two eponymous skills listed in the Code of Points.

Achievements

References

External links and sources
Whatever happened to Oksana Omelianchik?
List of competition results at Gymn Forum
Video of Oksana Omelianchik performing Omelianchik vault - 1987 Worlds, team optionals
Animation of a gymnast performing Omelianchik vault

1970 births
Living people
People from Ulan-Ude
Ukrainian female artistic gymnasts
Soviet female artistic gymnasts
Originators of elements in artistic gymnastics
World champion gymnasts
Medalists at the World Artistic Gymnastics Championships
Competitors at the 1986 Goodwill Games
Goodwill Games medalists in gymnastics
European champions in gymnastics